Redstone 3 may refer to:

 Mercury-Redstone 3, a 1961 spaceflight
 Redstone 3, codename for the 2017 Microsoft Windows 10 version 1709 update